Decennial liability insurance or "Inherent Defect Insurance" is insurance that is taken out (by the contractor or principal) to cover costs associated with the potential collapse of the building after completion.  The name derives from the fact that it covers the 10 year period after completion of the project.  It is compulsory to insure in a few countries such as France, and Egypt.  In other countries like Qatar there is the form of strict liability arising from the French Civil Code which does not require any proof of fault, but there is no compulsory requirement to insure.  The cost of the insurance can significantly increase construction costs and may be up to 1.5% of structural value (including the Technical Inspections that the insurers mandate).

Under French law (Article L241-1 of the Insurance Code), every builder is required to purchase a ten-year insurance policy covering the mandatory decennial warranty on all construction projects. The decennial warranty is a legal liability assumed by builders for all defects that compromise the integrity of their structures or that cause them to become unsuited for their intended purposes. This responsibility is mandated by Article 1792 et seq. of the Civil Code. It is imposed on builders for ten years from the acceptance date of the structure.

References 

Civil law (legal system)
Liability insurance